Cima di Gagnone is a medium sized mountain in the Lepontine Alps it is located in the Swiss canton of Ticino. It is located between the valleys of Verzasca and Leventina, south of Passo di Gagnone.

References

External links
 Cima di Gagnone on Hikr

Mountains of the Alps
Mountains of Switzerland
Mountains of Ticino
Lepontine Alps